Hotel (狂潮, literally The Ferocious Waves) is a Hong Kong television series, which premiered on 1 November 1976 on TVB. The theme song "Hotel" (狂潮) was composed and arranged by Joseph Koo with lyrics by Wong Jim and was sung by Susanna Kwan. Hotel was the first drama on TVB with a modern setting. The show's popularity was integral to the emergence of Chow Yun-fat's career. It is considered one of the most popular series in Hong Kong television history, and had about 1.9 million viewers. Hong Kong government figures show at the time, the city’s population was 4.551 million.

References

1970s Hong Kong television series
1976 Hong Kong television series debuts
1977 Hong Kong television series endings
Cantonese-language television shows
TVB dramas